Beatwin (Hangul: 비트윈; pronounced Between; stylized as BEATWIN) was a South Korean boy band formed by Elen Entertainment (formerly Heavenly Star Content) in Seoul, South Korea. The group currently consists of two members: Sunhyeok and Youngho. They debuted on January 6, 2014 with the single "She's My Girl". Their fans are called "Trophy".

Members

Current
 Sunhyeok (선혁)
 Youngho (영조)

Former
 Sanggyu (상규)
 Hyeontae (현태)
 Yoonhoo (윤후)
 Seongho (성호)
 Jungha (정하)

Discography

Extended plays

Singles

References

External links
 BEATWIN Official Website

K-pop music groups
South Korean boy bands
South Korean dance music groups
Musical groups from Seoul
Musical groups established in 2014
2014 establishments in South Korea
South Korean pop music groups